Church of St George is a Serbian Orthodox church in Grubišno Polje, Croatia.

See also
List of Serbian Orthodox churches in Croatia

External links
 Mitropolija Zagrebačko-ljubljanska, Grubišno Polje 

Serbian Orthodox church buildings in Croatia
Buildings and structures in Bjelovar-Bilogora County
18th-century churches in Croatia
18th-century Serbian Orthodox church buildings